Jesse Graham (born May 13, 1994) is a Canadian professional ice hockey defenceman currently playing for Barys Astana of the Kontinental Hockey League (KHL).

Playing career
Graham played major junior hockey with the Niagara IceDogs and Saginaw Spirit in the Ontario Hockey League (OHL) before he was selected in the sixth-round, 155th overall, by the New York Islanders in the 2012 NHL Entry Draft. and signed an entry-level contract with the team on May 31, 2014. He spent three seasons with the Islanders' American Hockey League affiliate the Bridgeport Sound Tigers, as well as spells in the ECHL for the Florida Everblades and Missouri Mavericks, before signing a one-year, two-way contract with the Colorado Avalanche on July 26, 2017.

Graham spent the 2017–18 season with the San Antonio Rampage, the AHL affiliation of the Avalanche. On August 30, 2018, Graham signed for the Utica Comets of the AHL, serving as the primary affiliate to the Vancouver Canucks.

After five professional seasons in North American, Graham opted to pursue a European career, moving to the Tipsport Liga in Slovakia to join HK Nitra on October 26, 2019. but left just two weeks later after playing three games for the team to join Finnish club, KalPa of Liiga.

Graham spent the duration of the 2021–22 season with Augsburger Panther of the Deutsche Eishockey Liga (DEL), contributing with 3 goals and 39 assists for 42 points in 52 games, leading the blueline in scoring.

As a free agent, Graham moved to the KHL, in agreeing to a one-year contract for the 2022–23 season with Kazakh based club, Barys Nur-Sultan, on July 20, 2022.

Career statistics

Regular season and playoffs

International

Awards and honours

References

External links

1994 births
Living people
Augsburger Panther players
Barys Nur-Sultan players
Bridgeport Sound Tigers players
Canadian ice hockey defencemen
Florida Everblades players
Ice hockey people from Ontario
KalPa players
Missouri Mavericks players
New York Islanders draft picks
Niagara IceDogs players
HK Nitra players
San Antonio Rampage players
Saginaw Spirit players
Sportspeople from Oshawa
Utica Comets players
Canadian expatriate ice hockey players in the United States
Canadian expatriate ice hockey players in Germany
Canadian expatriate ice hockey players in Kazakhstan
Canadian expatriate ice hockey players in Slovakia
Canadian expatriate ice hockey players in Finland